Kai Curry-Lindahl, Ph.D. (May 10, 1917 – December 5, 1990), was a Swedish zoologist and author. He was born in Stockholm.

He participated actively in the conservation debate, and was a conservation expert associated with the University of Stockholm between 1966 and 1969.

He was the head of the Skansen's natural history department between 1953 and 1974.

Between 1974 and 1983 he was a visiting professor at the University of California, Berkeley, and in 1974 and 1978 at the University of Guelph, Ontario.

From 1974 until his death he was an advisor to UN agencies UNESCO, FAO, UNEP, and about 35 African governments from his base in Nairobi. During most of that time he was also linked to the Swedish Environmental Secretariat.

Books
 Animals and humans in the Swedish countryside, 1955, Stockholm
 Some animal species distribution - Animal Geography, 1957, Stockholm
 Forests and animals, 1961, Stockholm
 Europe's natural, 1971, Stockholm
 Conservation for Survival: An Ecological Strategy, New York, 1972
 Lemming - a artmonografi, 1975, Bonnier, Stockholm, 
 The endangered animals worldwide, 1982, Stockholm
 The Future Of The Cairngorms, 1982, North East Mountains Trust with Adam Watson & R Drennan-Watson
 Our fish, 1985, Stockholm
 Mammals, amphibians & reptiles, 1988, Stockholm
 Tropical mountains, 1953, Stockholm
 The birds of Mount Nimba, Liberia  British Museum (Natural History) 1986 with Colston, Peter R

References

Swedish male writers
1917 births
1990 deaths
20th-century Swedish zoologists